Lieutenant General H.L.V.M. Liyanage, popularly known as Vikum Liyanage, is a senior Sri Lanka Army officer. He is the current Commander of the Sri Lanka Army. Prior to become the army commander, he was the 59th Chief of Staff of the Army. On 1 July 2022, Liyanage assumed as 24th Commander of Sri Lankan Army. Earlier, he served as the Commandant, Sri Lanka Army Volunteer Force as a Major General.

Military career 
General Liyanage joined the Sri Lanka Army on 27 October 1986 in the Regular Intake – 26 after military training at the Sri Lanka Military Academy and then in Pakistan Military Academy. After successful completion of training, he was commissioned as a second lieutenant in the Gajaba Regiment in 23 July 1987.

As a Major he served as the second-in-command of the 10 Gajaba Regiment; in the rank of lieutenant colonel he served as the commanding officer of 8 Gajaba Regiment. In the rank of full colonel, he served as the sector commander of Colombo Rifles Operations Command; as a Brigadier he served as the brigade commanders of 215 and 623 brigades. As a Major General he was the division commander of 21 Division and 57 Division and also the corps commander of the Security Forces Headquarters - West and later he served as the volunteer force commandant.

He has also served as director - psychological operations, director (doctrine and training) and director (operations and systems) in the Office of the Chief of Defence Staff (OCDS) as a Colonel; adjutant - General Sir John Kotelawala Defence University as a Major, staff officer -2 (admin) - regimental centre of the Gajaba Regiment and staff officer 2 - directorate of staff duties at the Army HQ (as a Major).

Personal life 
Liyanage is a past pupil of Vijaya College, Matale. He is married to Janaki and the couple is blessed with a daughter and a son.

Awards and decorations

He has received some of the highest awards in the Sri Lankan armed forces, which includes the  Rana Wickrama Padakkama and the Rana Sura Padakkama

110x110px

110px

References

External link
Biography in Sri Lanka Army's official web site

Commanders of the Sri Lanka Army
Sri Lankan lieutenant generals
Sinhalese military personnel
Gajaba Regiment officers
Living people
Year of birth missing (living people)
Alumni of Vijaya College, Matale
Date of birth missing (living people)